One Way is the seventh studio album by the Polish heavy metal band Turbo. It was released, on CC only, in 1992 through Carnage. The album was recorded in 1992 at Giełda studio in Poznań. The cover art was created by Radosław Kaczmarek and Mariusz Łechtański, and photographs by Włodzimierz Kowaliński.

Track listing

Personnel

Turbo
Wojciech Hoffmann – guitar 
Marcin Białożyk – guitar, vocals
Radosław Kaczmarek – bass guitar, vocals
Sławomir Bryłka – drums
Tomasz Goehs – drums

Production
Radek Kaczmarek – cover concept
Włodzimierz Kowaliński – photography
Wojciech Kurkowski – assistant
Jacek Frączek – assistant
Piotr "MaDcs" Madziar – engineering
Wojciech Hoffmann – producer
Mariusz Łechtański – cover art

Release history

References

1992 albums
Turbo (Polish band) albums